Robert Wallace Christie (September 20, 1913, in Toronto – May 22, 1996, in Toronto) was a Canadian actor and director.

Christie was born in Toronto in 1913 and received a B.A. from the University of Toronto. In 1936, he moved to England where he performed with various companies including the Old Vic Company. He served with the Canadian Army during World War II. After the war, he joined the CBC Radio Drama Department. He performed the role of Sir John A. Macdonald in the 1949 play Riel by John Coulter. He reprised his role in the CBC Television educational series Exploring Minds.

Christie joined the performing company at the Stratford Festival in 1953 and appeared on Broadway in Tamburlaine by Christopher Marlowe in 1956 and Love and Libel by Robertson Davies in 1960. In 1961 he played MacTaggart in Jake and the Kid, and in 1967, he appeared in the series Hatch's Mill. He has taught acting at Ryerson Polytechnic University, now Toronto Metropolitan University.

Personal life
He married British actress Marguerite Eliza "Margot" Syme on March 4, 1937 and was later divorced. They had two daughters, actress/singer Dinah Christie and artist Cedar Christie.
He married Canadian production and stage manager Grania Mortimer on July 17, 1964. They had one daughter, Fiona Christie, and two sons, Matthew Christie and David Christie.

References

External links
 Robert Christie archives at the Clara Thomas Archives and Special Collections, York University Libraries, Toronto, Ontario

1913 births
1996 deaths
Canadian male radio actors
Canadian male stage actors
Canadian male television actors
Canadian male film actors
Male actors from Toronto
20th-century Canadian male actors